Neobisiinae is a subfamily of pseudoscorpions in the family Neobisiidae.

Genera 
 Balkanoroncus
 Ernstmayria
 Microbisium
 Neobisium
 Novobisium
 Occitanobisium
 Paedobisium
 Parobisium
 Protoneobisium
 Roncobisium
 Roncus
 Trisetobisium

References 
 Chamberlin, J. C. 1930. A synoptic classification of the false scorpions or chela-spinners, with a report on a cosmopolitan collection of the same. Part II. The Diplosphyronida (Arachnida-Chelonethida). Annals and Magazine of Natural History, ser. 10, n. 5, p. 1–48 & 585–620.

External links 
 

Neobisiidae
Arthropod subfamilies